Gallowglass were a class of mercenary warriors.

Gallowglass may also refer to:

Gallowglass (novel), a novel by Barbara Vine
Gallowglass (miniseries), the television adaptation of the novel